Jean-Thomas "Tomi" Ungerer (28 November 1931 – 9 February 2019) was an Alsatian artist and writer. He published over 140 books ranging from children's books to adult works and from the fantastic to the autobiographical. He was known for sharp social satire and witty aphorisms. Ungerer is also famous as a cartoonist and designer of political posters and film posters.

Ungerer received the international Hans Christian Andersen Medal in 1998 for his "lasting contribution" as a children's illustrator.

Biography 
Ungerer was born in Strasbourg in Alsace, France, the youngest of four children to Alice (Essler) and Theo Ungerer. The family moved to Logelbach, near Colmar, after the death of Tomi's father, Theodore—an artist, engineer, and astronomical clock manufacturer—in 1936. Ungerer also lived through the German occupation of Alsace when the family home was requisitioned by the Wehrmacht.

As a young man, Ungerer was inspired by the illustrations appearing in The New Yorker magazine, particularly the work of Saul Steinberg. In 1957, the year after he moved to the U.S., Harper & Row published his first children's book, The Mellops Go Flying, and his second, The Mellops Go Diving for Treasure; by the early 1960s he had created at least ten children's picture books with Harper, plus a few others, and had illustrated some books by other writers. He also did illustration work for publications including The New York Times, Esquire, Life, Harper's Bazaar, The Village Voice, and for television during the 1960s, and began to create posters denouncing the Vietnam War.

Maurice Sendak called Moon Man (1966) "easily one of the best picture books in recent years." After Allumette: A Fable, subtitled With Due Respect to Hans Christian Andersen, the Grimm Brothers, and the Honorable Ambrose Bierce in 1974, he ceased writing children's books, focusing instead on adult-level books, many of which concern sexuality. He eventually returned to children's literature with Flix in 1998. Ungerer donated many of the manuscripts and artwork for his early children's books to the Children's Literature Research Collection at the Free Library of Philadelphia.

A consistent theme in Ungerer's illustrations is his support for European construction, beginning with Franco-German reconciliation in his home region of Alsace, and in particular European values of tolerance and diversity. In 2003, he was named Ambassador for Childhood and Education by the 47-nation Council of Europe.

In 2007, his home town dedicated a museum to him, the Musée Tomi Ungerer/Centre international de l’illustration.

Ungerer divided his time between Ireland, where he and his wife had moved in 1976, and Strasbourg. In addition to his work as a graphic artist and 'drawer', he was also a designer, toy collector and "archivist of human absurdity."

A biographical documentary film, Far Out Isn't Far Enough: The Tomi Ungerer Story, was produced in 2012. The film was featured at the 2013 Palm Springs International Film Festival. In 2015–2016, the Kunsthaus Zurich and the Museum Folkwang in Essen devoted a large exhibition to Ungerer's artistic oeuvre and in particular his collages. A comprehensive book has been published by Philipp Keel from Diogenes with essays by Tobias Burg, Cathérine Hug and Thérèse Willer.

Ungerer died on 9 February 2019 in Cork, Ireland, aged 87.

Work 
Tomi Ungerer described himself first and foremost as a story teller and satirist. Prevalent themes in his work include political satire (such as drawings and posters against the Vietnam War and against animal cruelty), eroticism, and imaginative subjects for children's books. Ungerer's publications are held by the German National Library, including:

Children's books 

 The Mellops Go Flying (1957)
 Mellops Go Diving for Treasure (1957)
 Crictor (1958)
 The Mellops Strike Oil (1958)
 Adelaide (1959)
 Christmas Eve at the Mellops (1960)
 Emile (1960)
 Rufus (1961)
 The Three Robbers (1961)
 Snail, Where Are You? (1962)
 Mellops Go Spelunking (1963)
 Flat Stanley (1964) — art by Tomi Ungerer, written by Jeff Brown
 One, Two, Where's My Shoe? (1964)
 Beastly Boys and Ghastly Girls (1964) — art by Tomi Ungerer, poems collected by William Cole
 Oh, What Nonsense! (1966) — art by Tomi Ungerer, edited by William Cole
 Orlando, the Brave Vulture (1966)
 Warwick's Three Bottles (1966) – with André Hodeir
 Cleopatra Goes Sledding (1967) – with André Hodeir
 What's Good for a 4-Year-Old? (1967) — art by Tomi Ungerer, text by William Cole
 Moon Man (Der Mondmann) (Diogenes Verlag, 1966)
 Zeralda's Ogre (1967)
 Ask Me a Question (1968)
 The Sorcerer's Apprentice (1969) — text by Barbara Hazen
 Oh, How Silly! (1970) — art by Tomi Ungerer, edited by William Cole
 The Hat (1970)
 I Am Papa Snap and These Are My Favorite No Such Stories (1971)
 The Beast of Monsieur Racine (1971)
 The Hut (1972)
 Oh, That's Ridiculous! (1972) — art by Tomi Ungerer, edited by William Cole
 No Kiss for Mother (1973)
 Allumette; A Fable, with Due Respect to Hans Christian Andersen, the Grimm Brothers, and the Honorable Ambrose Bierce (1974)
 The Great Song Book — ed. by Timothy John (1978) English version of Das grosse Liederbuch, 1975
 Tomi Ungerer's Heidi: The Classic Novel (1997) — art by Tomi Ungerer, text by Johanna Spyri
 Cats as Cats Can (1997)
 Flix (1998)
 Tortoni Tremelo the Cursed Musician (1998)
 Otto: The Autobiography of a Teddy Bear (1999)
 Zloty (2009)
 Fog Island (2013)

Adult books 

 Horrible. An account of the Sad Achievements of Progress
 Der Herzinfarkt (1962)
 The Underground Sketchbook (1964)
 The Party (1966)
 Fornicon (1969)
 Tomi Ungerer's Compromises (1970)
 Poster Art of Tomi Ungerer (1972)
 America (1974)
 Totempole (1976)
 Babylon (1979)
 Cat-Hater's Handbook, Or, The Ailurophobe's Delight (1981) — co-authored by William Cole
 Symptomatics (1982)
 Rigor Mortis (1983)
 Slow Agony (1983)
 Heute hier, morgen fort (1983)
 Far out Isn't Far Enough (1984)
 Femme Fatale (1984)
 Schwarzbuch (1984)
 Joy of Frogs (1985)
 Warteraum (1985)
 Schutzengel der Hölle (1986)
 Cats As Cats Can (1997)
 Tomi: A Childhood Under the Nazis (1998)
 Liberal Arts: The Political Art of Tomi Ungerer (1999)
 Erotoscope (2002)
 De père en fils (2002)

Other works 
[[File:Strasbourg janus.jpg|thumb|right|The Fontaine de Janus on Place Broglie]]
 Design of Dr. Strangelove film poster (1964)
 Design of the logo for the ill-fated Broadway musical Kelly (1965)
 Art work and poster for the film Monterey Pop (1968)
 Design of the Janus Aqueduct in Strasbourg (1988)

 Awards 
The biennial Hans Christian Andersen Award conferred by the International Board on Books for Young People is the highest recognition available to a writer or illustrator of children's books. Ungerer received the illustration award in 1998.

Ungerer received the 2014 Lifetime Achievement of the Year award at the Sexual Freedom Awards. In 2018, he was made a commander of the Legion of Honour.

 Literature 
  (ed.): Tomi Ungerer. Zwischen Marianne und Germania, on the occasion of the exhibitions of the same name at the Museum für Kunst und Gewerbe Hamburg, 19 December 1999 – 13 February 2000, and at the Deutsches Historisches Museum, Berlin, 16 March – 13 June 2000]. Prestel, Munich 1999
 Maria Linsmann: preface to exhibition catalogue Tomi Ungerer-Illustrationen und Plastiken, Burg Wissem,  of Troisdorf 2000
 Thérèse Willer: Tomi Ungerer, the "Picasso“ of caricature. In: Graphis. The international journal of design and communication, vol. 59, no. 348, 2003, pp 18–37
 Thérèse Willer: Tomi Ungerer. Das Tomi Ungerer Museum in Strasbourg. Diogenes, Zurich 2007, . (catalogue of the permanent exhibition, with 210 illustrations by Ungerer, three essays by Thérèse Willer and several introductions)
 Thérèse Willer: Tomi Ungerer: Energie. EnBW Service, Karlsruhe 2007, .
 Tomi Ungerer. Der schärfste Strich der westlichen Welt. du Kulturmedien, No. 812, Zurich 2010, Table of contents 
  (ed.): Expect the Unexpected. Essays über Tomi Ungerer zu seinem 80. Diogenes, Zurich 2011,

References

External links 

 
 
 Musée Tomi Ungerer
 Lambiek Comiclopedia page.
 Biography translated from an exhibition in Hanover
 Tomi Ungerer: The Artist and His Background d.hatena.ne.jp 1971
 
 
 

1931 births
2019 deaths
Alsatian-German people
Anti–Vietnam War activists
BDSM people
Chevaliers of the Ordre des Palmes Académiques
Commanders of the Ordre national du Mérite
Commandeurs of the Ordre des Arts et des Lettres
Recipients of the Order of Merit of Baden-Württemberg
Recipients of the Saarland Order of Merit
Film poster artists
French cartoonists
French children's book illustrators
French children's writers
French erotic artists
Hans Christian Andersen Award for Illustration winners
Officers Crosses of the Order of Merit of the Federal Republic of Germany
Officiers of the Légion d'honneur
Artists from Strasbourg
Writers from Strasbourg